Tibouchina karstenii is a species of flowering plant in the family Melastomataceae, native to Colombia. It was first described by Alfred Cogniaux in 1885. The type specimen is kept at the Naturhistorisches Museum Wien in Austria.

References

karstenii
Flora of Colombia
Plants described in 1885
Taxa named by Alfred Cogniaux